Hauke, is a fairly common Frisian masculine given name. According to onomatologist Rienk de Haan, this name developed from a reduced form of Germanic names starting with either Habuk- (meaning "hawk") or with Hug- (meaning "brain"). If the last etymology is correct, Hauke would be the Frisian version of Hugo. 

In the West Frisian language, masculine given names can usually be adapted to equivalent feminine given names. In the case of Hauke, this is accomplished by dropping the voiceless final syllable and adding a diminutive suffix in its place (in this case -je), resulting in Haukje. This is a reasonably common name in the Dutch province of Friesland, though often spelled Houkje, as Hauke is often spelled Houke there.

People with the name Hauke
Some notable people with this name are:

Given name
 Hauke Fuhlbrügge, former German runner
 Hauke Harder, German composer
 Hauke Jagau, German politician
 Hauke Haien, fictional character in Theodor Storm's novella Der Schimmelreiter

Surname
 The Polish Hauke-Bosak family
 Józef Hauke-Bosak (1834–1871), Polish general
 John Maurice Hauke (1775–1830), Polish general
 Julia Hauke (Julia, Princess of Battenberg, 1825–1895), daughter of John Maurice, wife of Prince Alexander of Hesse and by Rhine
Richard L. Hauke (1930–2001), American botanist
Tobias Hauke (born 1987), German field hockey player

See also
Auke (name)
Surnames from given names

References

Frisian masculine given names
German masculine given names
German-language surnames